Schrader Range is a mountain range in central Papua New Guinea. It is a part of the Bismarck Range.

See also
Schraeder Range languages

External links 
 Photo of the mountains

References

Mountain ranges of Papua New Guinea